The Boise State Broncos college football team competes as part of the National Collegiate Athletic Association (NCAA) Division I Football Bowl Subdivision (FBS), representing Boise State University as members of the Mountain West Conference. Since the establishment of the team in 1932 (although joined Division I in 1971 and FBS in 1996), Boise State has appeared in 20 bowl games. The Broncos have appeared in nine different bowl games, with multiple appearances in the Maaco Bowl Las Vegas/Las Vegas Bowl (5), the Humanitarian/MPC Computers Bowl (4),  the Fiesta Bowl (3) (which was part of the Bowl Championship Series (BCS) and now part of the New Year's Six), the Hawaii Bowl (2), and the Poinsettia Bowl (2). Boise State was the only school from a non automatic qualifying conference to receive an at-large bid into a BCS game during the 2009 NCAA Division I FBS football season. They went to the 2010 Fiesta Bowl that season (all other appearances by non-AQ schools were actually automatic bids under BCS rules). Their 2018 bowl appearance, the 2018 First Responder Bowl, was canceled due to inclement weather with 5:08 left in the first quarter and ruled a no contest.  Boise State's record is 12–7 in 20 bowl games.

Key

Bowl games

References

Boise State Broncos

Boise State Broncos bowl games